Castilleja tenuis is a species of Indian paintbrush, known by the common name hairy Indian paintbrush.

It is native to the Northwestern United States, California, Nevada, and British Columbia.

Description
Castilleja tenuis is an annual herb growing up to about 45 centimeters tall, green to purplish in color and coated in hairs.

The inflorescence is made up of many narrow bracts between which emerge the white to bright yellow pouched flowers.

External links

Jepson Manual Treatment Castilleja tenuis
Castilleja tenuis Photo gallery

tenuis
Flora of the West Coast of the United States
Flora of California
Flora of British Columbia
Flora of Idaho
Flora of Nevada
Flora of the Cascade Range
Flora of the Sierra Nevada (United States)
Natural history of the California Coast Ranges
Natural history of the Peninsular Ranges
Plants described in 1904
Flora without expected TNC conservation status